Mermaid Lagoon is a "port-of-call" (themed land) at Tokyo DisneySea in the Tokyo Disney Resort, and is themed to Disney's The Little Mermaid franchise.

Theming
The facade is made to look like the Palace of King Triton and features fanciful seashell-inspired architecture. This area is unique in that it is mostly indoors and recreates the feeling of being underwater. Most of the rides in this area are geared towards younger children. Inside Mermaid Lagoon's building, families can ride several flat-rides, explore the Ariel's Playground play area, and it formerly included a live entertainment show.

Attractions and entertainment

Triton's Kingdom (indoor section) 
 Jumpin' Jellyfish
 Blowfish Balloon Race
 The Whirlpool
 Ariel's Playground
 Mermaid Lagoon Theater:
Ariel's Greeting Grotto - (2005-2020, original outdoor location), (2020-present, current indoor location)

Outdoor section 

 Scuttle's Scooters
 Flounder's Flying Fish Coaster

Former attractions and entertainment

Triton's Kingdom (indoor section) 
 Mermaid Lagoon Theater:
 Under the Sea (2001-2014) 
 King Triton's Concert (2015-2020)
Notes: Originally scheduled to close on March 31, 2020, the outside location for Ariel's Greeting Grotto closed on January 31, 2020, in response to COVID-19. The area's Mermaid Lagoon Theater then closed on July 1, 2020, and became Ariel's new meet-and-greet location on September 29, 2020.

Shops
 The Sleepy Whale Shoppe
 Mermaid Treasures
 Kiss de Girl Fashions
 Mermaid Memories
 Grotto Photos & Gifts
 Sea Turtle Souvenirs

Restaurants
 Sebastian's Calypso Kitchen- A counter service restaurant that serves pizza, seafood, and sandwiches.

References

 
Themed areas in Walt Disney Parks and Resorts
Tokyo DisneySea
Amusement rides introduced in 2001
2001 establishments in Japan